Ebony is a dense black hardwood.

Ebony may also refer to:

Media
 Ebony (magazine)
 Ebony (band), a New Zealand band
 Ebony (album), an album by Yo-Yo
 Ebony, a fictional character from TV series The Tribe

Places
 Part of Stone-cum-Ebony, a civil parish in Kent
 Ebony, Kent, a hamlet south of Ashford in Kent, South East England
 Ebony, Virginia, a census-designated place in Brunswick County, Virginia, United States

Plants and their wood
 Diospyros, genus containing a number of species with black or pale-streaked wood
 Ceylon ebony (Diospyros ebenum)
 African Ebony (Diospyros mespiliformis)
 Black-and-white Ebony, Pale Moon Ebony (Diospyros malabarica)
 Makassar Ebony (Diospyros celebica)
 Coromandel Ebony (Diospyros melanoxylon)
 Mauritius Ebony (Diospyros tessellaria)
 Mun Ebony (Diospyros mun), a critically endangered plant
 Myrtle Ebony (Diospyros pentamera)
 New Guinea Ebony (Diospyros insularis), an endangered plant
 Queensland Ebony (Diospyros humilis)
 Red-fruited Ebony (Diospyros mabacea)
 Trochetiopsis ebenus or St Helena ebony, dark coloured wood used for local inlay work
 Brya ebenus,  Jamaican Ebony
 Ebenopsis ebano,  Texas Ebony

Other uses
Ebony (given name)
 Ebony, a female professional wrestler from the Gorgeous Ladies of Wrestling
Ebony Simpson (died 1992), female Australian murder victim

See also
 Ebony and Ivory (disambiguation)